Édouard Léonard (18 October 1882 – 23 March 1968) was a French racing cyclist. He rode in the 1920 Tour de France.

References

1882 births
1968 deaths
French male cyclists
Place of birth missing